A by-election was held for the New South Wales Legislative Assembly electorate of Redfern on 23 January 1882 because of the resignation of John Sutherland, ostensibly to accept an appointment to the Legislative Council, however he never took his seat in the council.

Dates

Result

John Sutherland resigned.

See also
Electoral results for the district of Redfern
List of New South Wales state by-elections

References

1882 elections in Australia
New South Wales state by-elections
1880s in New South Wales